was a Japanese artistic gymnast, Olympic champion and world champion.  He was part of the first Japanese team that succeeded to win gold medals in the team event at the Summer Olympics (1960) and World Championships (1962). In 1964 he won the first individual all-around Olympic gold medal for Japan. He was the flag bearer at the 1968 Summer Olympics.

Early life
Endō was born into a family of pharmacists. His mother died from tuberculosis when he was a nine-year-old student at Hiroomote Elementary School. He studied at Kubota Junior High School and Akita Technical High School, after which he studied at the Tokyo University of Education (now the University of Tsukuba), graduating in 1959. He later worked as assistant instructor of physical education at Nihon University.

Career

Endō won gold medals with the Japanese team in three Olympics, in 1960, 1964 and 1968. At the 1964 Summer Olympics in Tokyo, he also received two individual gold medals, in parallel bars, and in individual all-around.

Endō received six individual medals at the 1962 World Artistic Gymnastics Championships, including a gold medal in floor exercise, and Japan also won the team competition.
He received two individual silver medals at the 1966 World Artistic Gymnastics Championships, and Japan won the team competition.
Endō was a four-time Japanese all-around champion.

He retired after the 1968 Olympics to become a gymnastics coach and eventually professor at Nihon University. He also coached the national team at the 1972 Olympics, acted as director of the Japanese Olympic Committee and was twice appointed as vice-president of the Japan Gymnastic Association. In 1996, he received the Japanese Emperor's Medal, and in 1999 induced into the International Gymnastics Hall of Fame.

Endō died of esophageal cancer on March 25, 2009.

See also
List of multiple Olympic gold medalists

References

External links

1937 births
2009 deaths
Deaths from cancer in Japan
Deaths from esophageal cancer
Gymnasts at the 1960 Summer Olympics
Gymnasts at the 1964 Summer Olympics
Gymnasts at the 1968 Summer Olympics
Hiroomote Elementary School alumni
Japanese male artistic gymnasts
Olympic gold medalists for Japan
Olympic gymnasts of Japan
Olympic silver medalists for Japan
Olympic medalists in gymnastics
Medalists at the 1968 Summer Olympics
Medalists at the 1964 Summer Olympics
Medalists at the 1960 Summer Olympics
Recipients of the Medal with Purple Ribbon
People from Akita (city)
20th-century Japanese people
21st-century Japanese people